Rathbun Lake was constructed and is operated by the U.S. Army Corps of Engineers. Located at Chariton River mile marker 142, approximately 7 miles north of Centerville, Iowa, in Appanoose County, it is one of the largest lakes in Iowa. The lake was constructed to control flooding, provide recreation opportunities, abate stream pollution, fish and wildlife enhancement, and maintain minimum stream flow on the Chariton, Missouri, and Mississippi Rivers.  The Chariton and South Fork of the Chariton River are the major sources of water flowing into Rathbun Lake.

The construction of Rathbun Dam and Reservoir was authorized by the Flood Control Act of 1954 (Public Law 83-780). Construction of the dam and embankment began in September 1964. Most of the remains of the village of Griffinsville are underneath the lake. The dam itself is rolled earthfill construction and is 10,129 feet long, 30 feet wide at the top, and rises 100 feet above the streambed.  Operation as a multi-purpose unit began November 1969 and the top of multi-purpose pool (904 msl) was reached on October 10, 1970.  Rathbun Lake was dedicated July 31, 1971, with President Richard Nixon being the keynote speaker.

Camping, sightseeing, fishing, boating, picnicking and hunting are favorite activities on and near Rathbun Lake. The lake’s fish and wildlife resources provide sightseers, fishermen and hunters ample opportunities for their sports.  Bald eagles, white-tailed deer, Canada geese, wild turkey, crappie, walleye, channel catfish and other wildlife can be found at Rathbun Lake.  The size of the lake combined with the prevailing winds make Rathbun Lake one of the best sailing lakes in Iowa.  One marina concession area, Rathbun Lake Marina (near the dam), provides a full line of marina services.  Rathbun Lake is home to the Rathbun Yacht Club.

Eight parks have been developed for public recreation. Six are managed by the Corps of Engineers, and one state park is managed by the Iowa Department of Natural Resources.  Recreation facilities include boat ramps, courtesy docks, campgrounds, picnic areas and playgrounds.  Honey Creek State Park Resort opened in 2008 and is Iowa's first-ever state-run resort with more than a hundred guest rooms, an 18-hole golf course, and an indoor water park.

Rathbun Lake supplies the water treatment plant of Rathbun Regional Water Association (RRWA) which provides quality water to nearly 16,000 rural families, farms and communities in Iowa and Missouri.  Average production at the plant during 2001 was 4.37 million gallons per day; however, the annual usage of the RRWA water system is equal to only 4 inches of Rathbun Lake water surface.

References

Sources
U.S. Army Corps of Engineers: Rathbun Lake – Dam and River Basin
U.S. Army Corps of Engineers: Rathbun Lake – Lake Facts
U.S. Army Corps of Engineers: Rathbun Lake – Recreation Opportunities
Midwest Sailing
Rathbun Yacht Club
Iowa Department of Natural Resources
KCRG-TV News – Honey Creek State Park Resort Open for Business
Honey Creek Resort State Park
Rathbun Regional Water Association

Reservoirs in Iowa
Bodies of water of Appanoose County, Iowa
Tourist attractions in Appanoose County, Iowa
Dams in Iowa
United States Army Corps of Engineers dams